Cissus subaphylla is a low shrub in the grape family Vitaceae. It is endemic to the Yemeni island of Socotra. It does not have the climbing habit of other Cissus species, and its stems are flattened and gray-green in colour, with relatively small leaves and flowers. The tangled mats of C. subaphylla stems act as a protective covering for plants regularly eaten by goats and other browsing animals; the plant is thus important in the rehabilitation of species such as Dendrosicyos, Maerua and Commiphora.

Distribution

Cissus subaphylla is one of the dominant plant species found on the Socotra's coastal plains and low inland mountains. It grows in particular association with Salvadora persica and Croton socotranus, but is also found with Jatropha unicostata, Pulicaria stephanocarpa, Dendrosicyos socotranus, and Adenium obesum. subsp. sokotranum. About 270 of the island's 828 known plant species are endemic.

Conservation status
The plant life on Socotra is critically threatened – of 216 known plant species endemic to Socotra and its neighbour Abd al Kuri, 132 are believed to be threatened, and of these, 85 face immediate extinction. This situation is the direct result of livestock being introduced to an island flora which has never been subjected to large grazing and browsing mammals, and thus has had no time to evolve any defence.

References

External links
Flower image at Botany.cz

subaphylla
Plants described in 1882
Endemic flora of Socotra
Taxa named by Isaac Bayley Balfour
Taxa named by Jules Émile Planchon